Cool Kids may refer to:

Music
 The Cool Kids, an alternative hip-hop duo

Albums
 Cool Kids (album), a 1983 album by Kix
 Cool Kids, a 2011 EP by Natalie Walker

Songs
 "Cool Kids" (song), a 2013 song by Echosmith from their album Talking  Dreams
 "Cool Kids", a 1983 song by Kix from Cool Kids
 "Cool Kids", a 1996 song by Screeching Weasel from Bark Like a Dog
 "Cool Kids", a 2010 song by Fast Romantics
 "Cool Kids", a 2012 song by Lower Than Atlantis from Changing Tune
 "Cool Kids", a 2017 song by Kwaye

Other uses
 The Cool Kids (TV series)
Cool Kids (TV series)

See also
 Cool Kids Don't Cry, alternative English title for the film Achtste Groepers Huilen Niet
 Teenage Cool Kids, American indie rock group from Denton, Texas
 Cool Kids of Death, Polish alternative band